Notz is a surname of: 

 Dieter Notz (born 18 September 1955), German cross-country skier
 Florian Notz (born 24 April 1992), German cross-country skier
 Jedrij Notz (born 6 September 1974), Swiss-born alpine skier
 Juan Notz (born 21 October 1939), Venezuelan former tennis player
 Konstantin von Notz (born 21 January 1971), German lawyer and politician
 Walter Notz, Swiss footballer